Tourism in Haryana relates to tourism in the state of Haryana, India. There are 21 tourism hubs created by Haryana Tourism Corporation (HTC), which are located in Ambala, Bhiwani Faridabad, Fatehabad, Gurgaon, Hisar, Jhajjar, Jind, Kaithal, Karnal, Kurukshetra, Panchkula, Sirsa, Sonipat, Panipat, Rewari, Rohtak, Yamunanagar, Palwal and Mahendergarh.

Haryana is officially part of Mahabharata and Krishna tourism development circuit plans of government of India and government of Haryana.

Diversity of tourist attractions 
Haryana State Directorate of Archaeology & Museums and Haryana Tourism are responsible for archaeology and tourism in Haryana respectively.

 Highest point 
 National monuments
 State monuments
 Indus-Sarasvati civilization sites
 Monuments and memorials
 Culture
 Dams
 Forts
 Lakes
 Mountains
 Museums
 Music
 Temples
 Tourist attractions
 Other

Tourism by districts

Kurukshetra
Haryana is home to important religious sites dating to Vedic times. With a battery of temples and pilgrim centres concentrated in the 48-kosas (92 miles) of land described in the epic Mahabharata, legend and mythology play an important role in the history of Kurukshetra, a place where the celestial song 'Bhagwad Gita' is believed to have been delivered by Krishna to Arjuna.

Kurukshetra is also the location of Sheikh Chilli's Tomb.

Hisar
Firoz Shah Palace Complex, Asigarh Fort, Blue Bird Lake, Deer Park, Hisar, Banawali and Rakhigarhi Indus Valley civilisation sites, Kanwari Indus Valley civilisation site.

Faridabad
Badkhal Lake, Suraj Kund, Nahar Singh Mahal, Dabua Colony are some of tourist places in Faridabad.

Panchkula
Panchkula is known for Mansa Devi temple, Pinjore Gardens and Morni Hills.

Gurugram
Gurugram is famous for Sultanpur National Park. Its most famous for international tourist visits. It is located in Sultanpur village on Gurugram-Jhajjar highway 15 km from Gurugram city and 50 km from Delhi.

See also
 Divisions of Haryana

References